Mohsen Chegini (born 26 June 1967) is an Iranian film producer and director. He is best known for producing Popular Comedy TV shows such as The Good, The Bad, and The Corny, Barareh Nights, Doctors' Building, On Tiptoes and The Dots.

Filmography

Movies

Television

References

External Links
 

1967 births
Living people
Iranian television producers
Iranian film producers